Verbum nobile (The word of a nobleman) is a one-act comic opera by Polish national composer Stanisław Moniuszko written to a libretto by , and set in 18th century Poland before foreign partitions of the country. It was first performed at the Teatr Wielki, Warsaw, on 1 January 1861 to instant popularity.

Roles

Synopsis
The plot is a rehash of a familiar operatic theme. Zuzia and Michal are promised to each other by their parents, without their having met; they meet accidentally and fall in love. Michal, having given his name as Stanisław, is refused Zusia's hand by her father, who has given his word to Serwacy, Michal's father, on the betrothal. All is explained, preventing a duel between Marcin and Serwacy, and the marriage can go ahead.

Recordings
Poznań Opera conducted by Robert Satanowski, MUSA PND 247 (1993)
Verbum Nobile Aleksander Teliga, Leszek Skrla, Aleksandra Buczek, Michal Partyka, Janusz Lewandowski, Orkiestra Opery na Zamku, Warcislaw Kunc. Dux 2013

Notes and references

Operas
1861 operas
Polish-language operas
Operas by Stanisław Moniuszko
Operas set in Poland